The Kinver Light Railway operated a passenger and freight tramway service between Amblecote and Kinver, in South Staffordshire, between 1901 and 1930.

History

The Kinver Light Railway was a subsidiary of British Electric Traction. They acquired the Dudley and Stourbridge Steam Tramways Company in April 1898 and applied to the Light Railway Commissioners (in preference to the Tramways Act 1870) for permission to build a tramway from Amblecote to Kinver. 

The tramway was a single track with passing places. The route ran from outside the Fish Inn at Amblecote where it had a connection with the Dudley, Stourbridge and District Electric Traction Company tracks. After passing Wollaston and Stourton, it arrived in Kinver. From Amblecote to Wollaston Ridge it ran on the streets using conventional grooved rail. From there the line used Vignoles rail (non-grooved bullhead rail).   The use of Vignoles rail in conjunction with the tramway’s tight curves led to the Board of Trade Inspector imposing a 10 mph speed limit and recommending the use of single-deck tram cars only, while the lack of signalling at passing loops prevented operation at night.

Passenger service started on 4 April 1901.  The company was taken over by the Dudley, Stourbridge and District Electric Traction Company in 1902 for the sum of £60,000. Although parcels had been carried on passenger services from the outset, goods trailer vehicles were attached behind service cars for freight from September 1903. The company made significant money from this operation. Substantial quantities of milk were carried, such that occasionally passenger vehicles were commandeered for freight use.

The Sheffield Photo Company produced a film in 1904 entitled A Ride on the Kinver Light Railway. It was directed by Frank Mottershaw, a pioneer film maker.

The services finished on 8 February 1930, a victim of competition from motorbus traffic, and the final closure took place on 1 March 1930.

See also
Kidderminster and Stourport Electric Tramway Company (1898–1929) another contemporary local route operated by British Electric Traction group

References

Tram transport in England
3 ft 6 in gauge railways in England